The Turbat killings refers to the murder of three Baloch nationalist political leaders in April 2009. The nationalist leaders were kidnapped by gunmen who were allegedly speaking in Persian (a national language of neighbouring Afghanistan and Iran). The three murdered were:
 Ghulam Mohammed Baloch, 45, chairman of the Baloch National Movement
 Lala Munir Baloch, 50, general secretary of the Baloch National Front
 Sher Mohammed Baloch, 35, vice chairman of the Baloch Republican Party

According to an eyewitness, the trio were picked up by members of a security agency after they attended a court hearing in Turbat on April 3, 2009. Their mutilated and decomposed bodies were found five days later on April 8, 2009 in Pidrak, 35km away from their place of arrest. Baloch Liberation Army (BLA), a terrorist organisation, alleged that Pakistani security forces were behind the killing. However, the international experts have deemed it odd that the Pakistani forces would be careless enough to allow the bodies to be found so easily and light Balochistan on fire if they were truly responsible.

The killings sparked protests, riots and strikes in towns and cities in Balochistan and other Baloch-dominated areas of Pakistan.

References

See also
 Insurgency in Balochistan

Murder in Pakistan
Extrajudicial killings
Insurgency in Balochistan
Crime in Balochistan, Pakistan
2009 murders in Pakistan
Targeted killings in Pakistan
People murdered in Balochistan, Pakistan
Deaths by firearm in Balochistan, Pakistan